Louis Verbruggen (20 July 1928 – 15 February 2002) was a Belgian footballer. He played in three matches for the Belgium national football team from 1949 to 1951.

References

External links
 

1928 births
2002 deaths
Belgian footballers
Belgium international footballers
Place of birth missing
Association football forwards